Sauvé may refer to:

People
 Arthur Sauvé (1874–1944)
 Bob Sauvé (born 1955), Canadian ice hockey player
 Christopher Lee Sauvé (born 1979), Canadian pop artist
 Clément Sauvé, Canadian comic book artist
 Craig Sauvé (born 1981), Canadian politician and musician
 Delpha Sauvé (1901–1956), Canadian politician
 Jean-François Sauvé (born 1960), Canadian ice hockey player
 Jean-Marc Sauvé (born 1949), French civil servant
 Jeanne Sauvé (1922–1993), Canadian politician and journalist
 Julie Sauvé (1952–2020), Canadian synchronized swimming coach
 Louise Sauvé-Cuerrier (born 1926), Canadian educator and politician
 Maurice Sauvé
 Maxime Sauvé (born 1990), Canadian ice hockey player
 Monique Sauvé, Canadian politician
 Paul Sauvé (1907–1960), Canadian politician
 Paul Sauvé (curler) (1939–2020), Canadian curler
 Philippe Sauvé (born 1980), American ice hockey player
 Yann Sauvé (born 1990), Canadian ice hockey player

Places
 Bourassa-Sauvé, Quebec, Canada
 Sauvé (provincial electoral district), Quebec, Canada
 Sauvé's Crevasse, Louisiana, United States

Other
 Sauvé v Canada (Chief Electoral Officer), Canadian supreme court case

See also
 Sauve (disambiguation)